Washington Initiative 1029 (2008) was an initiative concerning long-term home health-care workers, approved in the Washington state general election of November 4, 2008. It required "long-term care workers to be certified as home care aides based on an examination, with exceptions; increase training and criminal background check requirements; and establish disciplinary standards and procedures."

External links

Text of measure at https://ballotpedia.org/Washington_Long-Term_Care_Initiative,_Initiative_1029_(2008)

Healthcare in Washington (state)
Initiatives in the United States